Spain participated at the 2015 Summer Universiade in Gwangju, South Korea.

Medal summary

Medal by sports

Medalists

References

External links
 Country overview: Spain on the official website

Nations at the 2015 Summer Universiade
Spain at the Summer Universiade
2015 in Spanish sport